Gunnar Gunnarsson (born 14 June 1933) is an Icelandic footballer. He played in seven matches for the Iceland national football team from 1953 to 1957.

References

External links
 

1933 births
Living people
Gunnar Gunnarsson
Gunnar Gunnarsson
Place of birth missing (living people)
Association footballers not categorized by position